Lakeville is a small village in Kings County, Nova Scotia.

It sits on the south-facing foot of the North Mountain, five kilometers due north of Coldbrook and is named for Silver Lake, a small lake popular for picnics and fishing.  Called Lakeville Lake by locals, Silver Lake is believed to be a glacial kettle lake.

Route 221 is the main thoroughfare.  The village is surrounded by rich farmland.

Communities in Kings County, Nova Scotia